Below is a list of squads used in the 1965 African Cup of Nations.

Group A

Ethiopia
Coach: 
|

Senegal
Coach: Habib Bâ and Libasse Diop
|

Tunisia
Coach: Mokhtar Ben Nacef
|

Group B

Congo-Léopoldville
Coach: Léon Mokuna
|

Ghana
Coach: Charles Gyamfi 
|

Ivory Coast
Coach: 
|

External links
African Nations Cup 1965 - Details and Scorers RSSSF
CAN 1965

Africa Cup of Nations squads
Squads